Epi Map is a module that displays geographic maps with data from Epi Info. Epi Map is built around the Esri MapObjects software. Epi Map displays shapefiles containing the geographic boundaries layered with data results from the Analysis module.

Epi Map is designed to show data from Epi Info 2000 files by relating data fields to SHAPE files containing the geographic boundaries. Shapefiles also can contain data on population or other variables, and can therefore provide numeric data that become part of the display either as numerator or denominator.

See also 

Free statistical software
Geographic information system
Geospatial analysis
List of geographic information systems software
Cartogram
CrimeStat
ArcView
MapInfo

References

External links
Epi Info
Epi Info Community of Users
Epi Info Community Portal
 Cartogram Central

Centers for Disease Control and Prevention
Public-domain software
Science software for Windows
Data analysis software
Geographic information systems